Ilija Vakić (born 30 July 1932) is a Serbian retired politician who served as Chairman of the Executive Council of the Autonomous Province of Kosovo and Metohija within SFR Yugoslavia from May 1967 to May 1974.  He was a member of the League of Communists of Kosovo. He was succeeded in office by Bogoljub Nedeljković.

References

1932 births
Prime ministers of Kosovo
Yugoslav politicians
Living people
Politicians from Mitrovica, Kosovo
Central Committee of the League of Communists of Yugoslavia members